Andreas Theodoridis  (born ) is a former Greek male volleyball player. He was part of the Greece men's national volleyball team. He competed with the national team at the 1994 FIVB Volleyball Men's World Championship in Athens. He played for Olympiacos for the biggest part of his career, winning the 1996 CEV Cup Winners' Cup, numerous domestic titles and major European honours with the club.

Clubs
  Olympiacos
  Panellinios

References

External links
profile at greekvolley.gr

1968 births
Living people
Greek men's volleyball players
Olympiacos S.C. players
Sportspeople from Kavala